Eusebio Cuerno de la Cantolla (1850–1922) was a Spanish journalist and businessman.

1850 births
1922 deaths
Writers from Cantabria
Spanish journalists
19th-century Spanish businesspeople
People from Santander, Spain
20th-century Spanish businesspeople